Cedar Sigo (born February 2, 1978 in Washington State) is a Suquamish American writer of art, literature and film.

Background
Cedar Sigo was raised in Suquamish located within the Port Madison Indian Reservation in Washington state. In 1995 he was awarded a scholarship to study at Naropa Institute's Jack Kerouac School of Disembodied Poetics in Boulder Colorado. It was there that he studied  and interacted with well-known poets, such as Allen Ginsberg, Anne Waldman, Lisa Jarnot, Alice Notley, and Joanne Kyger.

Sigo is the author of several books and pamphlets of poetry, some of which have been included in various magazines and anthologies. Sigo has given poetry readings in various locations across the United States, including the Poetry Project at St. Mark's Church, the Museum of Contemporary Art, The San Francisco Poetry Center, San Francisco Art Institute, and the Suquamish Community House, also called sgwәdzadad qәł ?altxw (The House of Awakened Culture). His poems have appeared in The Poker, Yolanda Pipeline's Magazine, Shampoo, RealPoetik, Puppy Flowers, Suspect Thoughts, 6x6, and New York Nights, among other journals. Currently, he still lives in Washington State.

Works
Selected Writings: Cedar Sigo (Ugly Duckling Presse, 2003) 
Selected Writings (Expanded Second Edition) (Ugly Duckling Presse, 2005) 
Death Race V.S.O.P. (with Micah Ballard & Will Yackulic) (Red Ant, 2005)
Expensive Magic (House Press, 2008)
Stranger in Town (City Lights Publishers, 2010) 
"Language Arts" (Wave Books, 2014)
 "Royals" (Wave Books, 2017)
There You Are: Interviews, Journals, and Ephemera (ed. Cedar Sigo for Joanne Kyger) (Seattle: Wave Books, 2017).

References

External links
Book Review of Stranger in Town
Cedar Sigo reads for SPD's New Lit Generation at LitCrawl
Cedar Sigo in EOAGH, a Journal of the Arts
Cedar Sigo - The Emerald Tablet

Living people
1978 births
21st-century American male writers
21st-century American poets
21st-century Native Americans
American male poets
LGBT Native Americans
American LGBT poets
Native American poets
Suquamish people
20th-century Native Americans
21st-century LGBT people